Robert Francis Mulvihill (March 9, 1924 – May 17, 2016) was an American professional basketball player. He played in the National Basketball League for the Oshkosh All-Stars during the 1948–49 season and averaged 0.9 points per game. He also spent a season playing for Torrington in the East Coast League.

During college, Mulvihill played for Fordham but was interrupted by serving in World War II (during which time he played for the University of Rochester). He finished his collegiate career at Fordham however. Mulvihill eventually moved to Clifton, New Jersey and taught at St. Peter's Preparatory School in Jersey City, New Jersey. He spent 37 years in the school system before retiring.

References

1924 births
2016 deaths
United States Marine Corps personnel of World War II
American men's basketball players
Basketball players from Washington, D.C.
Guards (basketball)
Fordham Rams men's basketball players
Military personnel from Washington, D.C.
Oshkosh All-Stars players
Rochester Yellowjackets men's basketball players
Schoolteachers from New Jersey
Sportspeople from Clifton, New Jersey